The Offshore Industry Liaison Committee (OILC) was a trade union set up in the United Kingdom in response to the deaths of 167 workers on the Piper Alpha platform on 6 July 1988. Their deaths would be followed by the death of another worker on the Ocean Odyssey oil rig on 22 September 1988.

The OILC is now a branch of the National Union of Rail, Maritime and Transport Workers (RMT), having agreed to merge from April 2008.

References

External links

Offshore Industry Liaison Committee

Defunct trade unions of the United Kingdom
Breakaway trade unions
North Sea
Energy in the United Kingdom
Trade unions established in 1988
Trade unions disestablished in 2008
1988 establishments in the United Kingdom